This is the discography of rapper Petey Pablo.

Albums

Studio albums

Unreleased Death Row albums
 Same Eyez on Me (2005)
 Life on Death Row(2008)
 Proper Procedures (Escape from tha Row)

Mixtapes
 2012: Carolina #1
 2014: Carolina Bound

Singles

As lead artist

As featured artist

Guest appearances

Notes

References

Hip hop discographies
Discographies of American artists